Shams is an Arabic origin word which is used as a unisex given name and a surname. People with the name include:

Given name
 Shams (singer) (born 1980), a Saudi-Kuwaiti singer
 Shams Abbasi (1924–2011), Pakistani scholar
 Shams al-Din, multiple people
 Shams Badran (1929–2020), Egyptian military officer
 Shams al-Baroudi (born 1945), Egyptian actress
 Shams Charania (born 1994), American television presenter
 Shams C. Inati, American scholar
 Shams Langeroodi (born 1950), Iranian poet
 Shams Mulani (born 1997), Indian cricketer
 Shams Pahlavi (1917–1996), member of the Iranian royal family
 Shams Sumon, Bangladeshi actor
 Shams Tabrizi (1185–1248), Iranian Sufi mystic

Surname
 Ajmal Shams, Afghan politician and engineer
 Ibrahim Shams (1917–2001), Egyptian Olympic weightlifter
 Fatemeh Shams (born 1983), Iranian poet and literary scholar 
 Hossein Shams (born 1961), Iranian futsal coach and football player
 Kalimuddin Shams (1939–2013), Indian politician
 Mohammad Shams (born 1954), Iranian musical artist
 Noorena Shams (born 1997), Pakistani sportsperson
 Randy J. Shams, American musical artist
 Siavash Shams (born 1963), Iranian musical artist
 Sumera Shams (born 1991), Pakistani politician
 Wahid Shams Kolahi (born 1965), Iranian German engineer

Arabic unisex given names
Arabic-language surnames
Persian unisex given names
Persian-language surnames